Nacho is the common short form of the Spanish name Ignacio. The feminine form is Nacha, for the given name Ignacia.

Origin
Although there is no official record for it, it seems to be connected with the visit of Ignacio de Loyola to Rome in 1538 to get the Pope's approval for his foundation of the Company of Jesus. During his stay in Italy, the Italian pronunciation of his Spanish name, Ignacio, led to the form Nacho and remained as a familiar way to address people named Ignacio. Since then, Jesuits are commonly called "nachos".

Film and television
Nacho Barahona (born 1970), Spanish film editor
Nacho Cerdà (born 1969), Spanish film director
Nacho Galindo (actor) (1908-1973), Mexican-American actor
Nacho Guerreros (born 1973), Spanish actor
Nacho Martínez (1952–1996), Spanish actor
Nacho Vidal (born 1973), Spanish pornographic actor
Nacho Vigalondo (born 1977), Spanish filmmaker
Nacho Varga, Fictional drug cartel member

Music
Nacho Cano (born 1963), Spanish arranger, composer, musician and record producer
Nacho Canut (born 1957), Spanish bass player in the band Fangoria
Nacho Chapado (born 1970), Spanish Dj and producer
Nacho (singer),  Venezuelan singer, songwriter and political activist Miguel Ignacio Mendoza Donatti (born 1983)
Nacho Galindo (singer) (born 1959), Mexican singer for the group Conjunto Primavera
Nacho Picasso (born 1983), American rapper

Sports

Basketball
Nacho Azofra (born 1969), Spanish basketball player
Nacho Díez (born 1996), Spanish basketball player
Nacho Martín (born 1983), Spanish basketball player
Nacho Rodríguez (born 1970), Spanish basketball player
Nacho Yáñez (born 1973), Spanish basketball player

Football
Nacho (footballer, born 1967), José Ignacio Fernández Palacios, Spanish retired footballer
Nacho (footballer, born 1980), Ignacio Pérez Santamaría, Spanish retired footballer
Nacho (footballer, born 1989), José Ignacio Martínez García, Spanish footballer
Nacho (footballer, born 1990), José Ignacio Fernández Iglesias, Spanish footballer
Nacho (footballer, born 1993), Ignacio Agustín Sánchez Romo, Spanish footballer
Nacho Casanova (born 1987), Spanish footballer
Nacho Cases (born 1987), Spanish footballer
Nacho Fernández (footballer, born 1980), Ignacio Fernández Rodríguez, Spanish footballer
Nacho Garro (born 1981), Spanish footballer
Nacho Monreal (born 1986), Spanish footballer
Nacho Monsalve (born 1994), Spanish footballer
Nacho Neira (born 1986), Spanish footballer
Nacho Novo (born 1979), Spanish footballer
Ronald García (born 1980), Bolivian footballer nicknamed "Nacho"
Nacho González (footballer, born 1971), Ignacio Carlos González Cavallo, Argentine goalkeeper
Nacho González (footballer, born 1982), Ignacio María González, Uruguayan midfielder
Ignacio Scocco (born 1985), Argentine footballer nicknamed "Nacho"

Other sports
Nacho Albergamo, former All-American college football player
Nacho Elvira (born 1987), Spanish golfer
Nacho Figueras (born 1977), Argentine polo player and face of Ralph Lauren Polo fragrances

Other fields
Ignacio Anaya (c. 1894–1975), Mexican restaurateur credited as the creator of Nachos
Nacho Duato (born 1957), Spanish classical ballet dancer and choreographer
Nacho López (1923–1986), Mexican photojournalist

References

Spanish masculine given names
Lists of people by nickname
Spanish-language hypocorisms